The 2022 Kirkfield Park provincial by-election was held on December 13, 2022.

Background 
The by-election was triggered after MLA Scott Fielding resigned from the Legislative Assembly and Executive Council of Manitoba. The election date was set on November 23, 2022.

Kevin Klein was declared the winner of the election.

Candidates 
Four candidates registered:

 Logan Oxenham – New Democratic Party of Manitoba
 Kevin Klein – Progressive Conservative Party of Manitoba
 Rhonda Nichol – Manitoba Liberal Party
 Dennis Bayomi – Green Party of Manitoba

Results 
Advance voting began on December 3.

Previous results 

^ Change is from redistributed results

References 

Politics of Winnipeg
Provincial by-elections in Manitoba
2022 elections in Canada
2022 in Manitoba
December 2022 events in Canada